Danial Shahbakhsh (born 18 March 2000) is an Iranian boxer. In 2021 he competed in the men's featherweight event at the 2020 Summer Olympics, then became the first Iranian boxer to win a medal at the World Championships.

References

External links
 

2000 births
Living people
Iranian male boxers
Olympic boxers of Iran
Boxers at the 2020 Summer Olympics
AIBA World Boxing Championships medalists
People from Zahedan
21st-century Iranian people